One human poll comprised the 1945 National Collegiate Athletic Association (NCAA) football rankings. Unlike most sports, college football's governing body, the NCAA, does not bestow a national championship, instead that title is bestowed by one or more different polling agencies. There are two main weekly polls that begin in the preseason—the AP Poll and the Coaches' Poll. The Coaches' Poll began operation in 1950; in addition, the AP Poll did not begin conducting preseason polls until that same year.

Legend

AP Poll
The final AP Poll was released on December 2, at the end of the 1945 regular season, weeks before the major bowls. The AP would not release a post-bowl season final poll regularly until 1968.

References

College football rankings